Mid Mon Valley Transit Authority is a public transportation service located in Washington County, Westmoreland County, and a small portion of Fayette County in Pennsylvania. It provides inter-city bus and paratransit service to select communities within the area. The Mon Valley region is located within the metropolitan (but, except for Finleyville, not the urban) area of Pittsburgh; however, daily bus routes are provided to the city, with hourly service for much of the day on Monday through Friday.

Route List
Effective October 1, 2022 the MMVTA revamped their entire route system.
Commuter A- Donora, Monessen, Charleroi, North Charleroi, Fisher Heights (Carroll Township), Monongahela, New Eagle, Crookham Park & Ride (Union Township), Finleyville to Downtown Pittsburgh (7 days)
Commuter Express 1- Donora, Monongahela, New Eagle to Downtown Pittsburgh (M-F, limited stops)
Commuter Express 2- Donora, Monessen, Charleroi to Downtown Pittsburgh (M-F, limited stops)
Cal Commuter- Downtown Pittsburgh, Large Park & Ride (Jefferson Hills) to California University of Pennsylvania (weekday rush)
Local 1- New Eagle, Monongahela, Mon Valley Hospital, Fisher Heights Giant Eagle (Carroll Township), Charleroi, North Charleroi, Lower Belle Vernon, North Belle Vernon to Rostraver Township Shopping Centers (M-F)  
Local 2- West Brownsville Walmart, California University of Pennsylvania, California Borough, Elco, Roscoe, Stockdale, Allenport, Dunlevey, Charleroi to Rostraver Township shopping centers, Donora Monongahela, New Eagle (M-F)
Local 3- Mon Valley Hospital, Fisher Heights Giant Eagle (Carroll Township), Donora, Monessen, Rostraver Shopping centers (M-F)
Local 4- (Formerly Weekender 1) New Eagle, Monongahela, Donora, Monessen, Rostraver Shopping Centers (Weekends only)
Local 5- (Formerly Weekender 2) West Brownsville Walmart, California Borough, Elco, Roscoe, Stockdale, Allenport, Dunlevey, Charleroi, North Charleroi, Lower Belle Vernon, N. Belle Vernon, Rostraver Shopping Centers (weekend only)

Park & Ride Lots
California University of Pennsylvania (California)- 71 spaces (Cal Commuter, Local 2, Local 5)
Chamber Plaza (Charleroi)- 50 spaces (Commuter A, Commuter Express 2, Local 1, Local 2, Local 5)
Crookham (Union Township)- 50 spaces (Commuter A)
Large (Jefferson Hills)- 400 space lot owned by Port Authority of Allegheny County (Cal Commuter)
MMVTA Bus Garage (Donora)- 20 spaces (Commuter A, Commuter Express 1, Commuter Express 2 )
MMVTA Transit Center (North Charleroi)- 10 spaces (Commuter A, Commuter Express 2, Local 1) (Closed indefinitely as of 1/2023 due to rock slide)

References

External links
http://www.mmvta.com/fares-ticketing/
http://www.mmvta.com/park-ride-lots/
http://www.mmvta.com

Bus transportation in Pennsylvania
Transportation in Fayette County, Pennsylvania
Transportation in Washington County, Pennsylvania
Transportation in Westmoreland County, Pennsylvania
Transportation in Pittsburgh